These are the Group C Results and Standings:

Standings

Results/Fixtures

All times given below are in Central European Time.

Game 1
December 11, 2007

Game 2
December 18–19, 2007

Game 3
January 8, 2008

Game 4
January 15, 2008

Game 5
January 22, 2008

Game 6
January 29, 2008

Group C
2007–08 in Croatian basketball
2007–08 in Greek basketball
2007–08 in Russian basketball
2007 in Cypriot sport
2008 in Cypriot sport